Regan Mizrahi  is an American former child actor from New Jersey, known for his role as the voice of Boots the Monkey in the television series Dora the Explorer. He began working professionally at the age of three and has appeared in numerous national television commercials and radio ads.  He is the great grandson of radio personality Nat Hale and is a member of Mensa.

Mizrahi has appeared on Rescue Me, Blue Bloods, White Collar, Human Giant, and Saturday Night Live. Some of his film work includes Ice Age: Dawn of the Dinosaurs , Nature Calls, The Pleasure of Your Company, and White Irish Drinkers.

Mizrahi is the founder of Young Performers Against Bullying, a charitable organization that raises funds and awareness for anti-bullying programs in public schools.

Regan was featured in the 34st.com article, "Spending a Day in Regan Mizrahi's Boots, Meet the Penn freshman who used to play Boots on 'Dora the Explorer.'"

Guest star roles in TV series
 Saturday Night Live - NBC - "Justin Timberlake/Jimmy Fallon episode - Twin Bed" - role of "Little Cousin"
 Saturday Night Live - NBC - "Thanksgivies" - role of "Trevor"
 Blue Bloods - CBS (2012) - Episode #312 "The Job" - role of Wyatt Richmond
Dora's Explorer Girls: Our First Concert - Nickelodeon (2011) - Boots the Monkey
 Nickelodeon Mega Music Fest - Nickelodeon (2010) - Boots the Monkey
 Saturday Night Live - NBC - "Broadview Security" digital short - role of "child intruder"
 Human Giant - MTV - two episodes 2007 - role of little Kevin
 Dora the Explorer - Nickelodeon - Boots the Monkey
 Rescue Me - FX (TV network) - two episodes (#513 and #514) - the role of Timmy
 Saturday Night Live - NBC - "Twas The Night" comedy skit with host John Malkovich
 Miss Lori and Hooper - PBS KIDS - seven episodes 2006 - 2007 - role of "classroom kid"
 White Collar - USA Network - role of "young Mozzie"

Films
 2012 Nature Calls - Kent
 2010 White Irish Drinkers - Young Brian
 2009 Ice Age: Dawn of the Dinosaurs - Additional Voices (voice)/adr loop group
 2009 Old Dogs - Timmy the roof boy
 2006 The Pleasure of Your Company aka Wedding Daze'' - Diner Boy

Awards and nominations

AWARD 2016

Silver Medalist - National Spanish Exam 

AWARD 2017

UNIVERSITY OF ROCHESTER - Frederick Douglass and Susan B. Anthony Award

• Demonstrated commitment to understanding and addressing difficult social issues

• Leadership and dedication to community action

• Strong grades and rigorous courses taken in the humanities and social sciences

2018 National Merit Scholarship Competition

2018 Recipient of the John Sousa Award

References

External links

American male child actors
Place of birth missing (living people)
Year of birth missing (living people)
Living people
People from New Jersey
Mensans